The Marshepaug River is a  stream in the towns of Goshen and Litchfield in northwest Connecticut in the United States. The river rises near the southwest corner of Woodbridge Lake and then flows in a southwest direction through the Milton Center Historic District to its mouth on the East Branch of the Shepaug River.

History
During the 19th century, the river provided waterpower for sawmills, gristmills, bloomery forges, and other industries.

References

Rivers of Connecticut
Rivers of Litchfield County, Connecticut
Goshen, Connecticut
Litchfield